Heart 102.7 may refer to:

 Heart Peterborough in Peterborough
 Heart Sussex in Reigate